The canton of Contes is an administrative division of the Alpes-Maritimes department, southeastern France. Its borders were modified at the French canton reorganisation which came into effect in March 2015. Its seat is in Contes.

It consists of the following communes:

Bendejun 
Berre-les-Alpes
Blausasc
Breil-sur-Roya
La Brigue
Cantaron
Châteauneuf-Villevieille
Coaraze
Contes
Drap
L'Escarène
Fontan
Lucéram
Moulinet
Peille
Peillon
Saorge
Sospel
Tende
Touët-de-l'Escarène

References

Cantons of Alpes-Maritimes